Aulae or Aulai was a town on the coast of ancient Caria, on the Bozburun Peninsula.

Its site is located near Orhaniye, Muğla Province, Turkey.

References

Populated places in ancient Caria
Former populated places in Turkey
History of Muğla Province